Kenneth or Ken Dean may refer to:

Ken Dean (rugby league) (1926/7–2017), rugby league footballer
Ken Dean (Australian footballer) (born 1938), Australian rules footballer
Kenneth Dean (academic), Chinese cultural studies professor

See also
 Kenneth Deane (disambiguation)
Dean (surname)